XHOX-FM is a radio station in Ciudad Obregón, Sonora, Mexico. Broadcasting on 99.3 FM, the station is owned by Radio Grupo García de León and carries the national Exa FM format from MVS Radio.

History
XEOX-AM received its concession on September 26, 1939 and signed on on November 20 of that year from Los Mochis, Sinaloa. It was owned by Luis Felipe García de León and broadcast on 1230 kHz. The station moved to 1340 kHz in Ciudad Obregón for economic reasons in 1941; the station would soon move to 1430. The current concessionaire took possession of the station in 1977, and it became an AM-FM combo in 1994, with the FM station at first broadcasting on 106.9 MHz.

In May 2005, XHOX-FM moved from 106.9 to 106.5 MHz and increased its ERP from 3,000 to 10,000 watts. As part of its 2017 concession renewal, on May 4, 2018, XHOX-FM moved again, this time to 99.3 MHz, in order to clear 106-108 MHz as much as possible for community and indigenous radio stations. Additionally, in late 2017, the station surrendered its AM frequency.

References

Radio stations in Sonora
Radio stations established in 1939
1939 establishments in Mexico